Richard the Lion was a fictional character in a comic strip in the UK comic The Beano, starting in issue 1678, dated 14 September 1974, and continuing for another few years afterwards.

Drawn by David Gudgeon, Richard, a mangy lion and self-styled "king" of Lord Threadbare's safari park, managed the other animals for his Lordship. Other regular characters included Lord Threadbare's butler and his nephew Oswald.

External links

1974 comics debuts
British comics characters
Beano strips
DC Thomson Comics characters
Lions in literature
Fictional kings
Comics set in Africa
Jungles in fiction
Male characters in comics
Comics characters introduced in 1974